Chulpan (Sulpan) is a rural locality (a village) in Satyyevsky Selsoviet, Miyakinsky District, Bashkortostan, Russia. The population was 24 as of 2010. There is 1 street.

Geography 
Chulpan is located 24 km south of Kirgiz-Miyaki (the district's administrative centre) by road. Bayazitovo and Satyevo are the nearest rural localities.

References 

Rural localities in Miyakinsky District